A cavalier hat is a variety of wide-brimmed hat popular in the 17th century. These hats were often made from felt, and usually trimmed with an ostrich plume. They were often cocked up or had one side of the brim pinned to the side of the crown of the hat (similar to the slouch hat) which was then decorated with feathers.

Cavalier hats get their name from supporters of King Charles I during the English Civil War, known as cavaliers, noted for wearing extravagant clothing. It was a common hat style throughout Europe during the 17th century, until it was later replaced in fashion by the tricorne.

See also
 List of hats and headgear

References

Hats
English Civil War
17th-century fashion
18th-century fashion
Military hats